This is a list of vascular plants that are indigenous to, or naturalised on, Norfolk Island. The list is based on the most recent authoritative treatment of Norfolk Island, the 1994 Flora of Australia 49. That source is dated in places; for example its classification of the flowering plants uses the Cronquist system, aspects of which are no longer accepted. This list therefore differs from the Flora of Australia treatment in several areas; these are footnoted.

List of flora of Norfolk Island
Norfolk Island has 523 taxa of vascular plants, 136 of which are indigenous, and 387 naturalised. Forty-four of the indigenous taxa are endemic. There are two endemic genera, Ungeria and Streblorrhiza.

Eudicotyledons
The eudicots are represented on Norfolk Island by 75 families, 220 genera, and 287 species.

Acanthaceae
 Hypoestes phyllostachya
 Ruellia ciliosa (Naturalised)

Aizoaceae
 Carpobrotus glaucescens
 Tetragonia implexicoma
 Tetragonia tetragonioides

Amaranthaceae<ref name="Amaranthaceae">Flora of Australia listed a number of species under family Chenopodiaceae; these are here listed under Amaranthaceae in accordance with the APG II system.</ref>
 Achyranthes arborescens (Endemic)
 Achyranthes aspera Achyranthes margaretarum (Endemic)
 Alternanthera sessilis (Possibly indigenous)
 Amaranthus blitum (Naturalised)
 Amaranthus hybridus (Naturalised)
 Amaranthus viridis (Naturalised)
 Atriplex cinerea Atriplex semibaccata (Naturalised)
 Chenopodium album (Naturalised)
 Chenopodium ambrosioides (Naturalised)
 Chenopodium murale (Naturalised)
 Sarcocornia quinquefloraAnacardiaceae
 Schinus terebinthifolius (Naturalised)

Apiaceae
 Apium graveolens (Naturalised)
 Centella asiatica (Naturalised)
 Ciclospermum leptophyllum (Naturalised)
 Coriandrum sativum (Naturalised)
 Daucus glochidiatus (Naturalised)
 Foeniculum vulgare (Naturalised)
 Petroselinum crispum (Naturalised)
 Torilis nodosa (Naturalised)

Apocynaceae
 Alyxia gynopogon (Endemic)
 Melodinus baueri (Endemic)
 Vinca major (Naturalised)

Araliaceae
 Delarbrea paradoxa (Naturalised)
 Meryta angustifolia (Endemic)
 Meryta latifolia (Endemic)
 Schefflera actinophylla (Naturalised)
 Tetrapanax papyrifer (Naturalised)

Asclepiadaceae
 Gomphocarpus physocarpus (Naturalised)
 Tylophora biglandulosaAsteraceae
 Ageratina riparia (Naturalised)
 Ageratum conyzoides (Naturalised)
 Arctotheca calendula (Naturalised)
 Argyranthemum frutescens (Naturalised)
 Aster subulatus (Naturalised)
 Bidens pilosa (Naturalised)
 Calendula officinalis (Naturalised)
 Carduus pycnocephalus (Naturalised)
 Carduus tenuiflorus (Naturalised)
 Centaurea melitensis (Naturalised)
 Conyza bonariensis (Naturalised)
 Conyza sumatrensis (Naturalised)
 Cotula australis (Naturalised)
 Crassocephalum crepidioides (Naturalised)
 Erechtites valerianifolia (Naturalised)
 Erigeron karvinskianus (Naturalised)
 Euchiton involucratus (Naturalised)
 Euchiton sphaericus Euryops chrysanthemoides (Naturalised)
 Erechtites hieraciifolia (Naturalised)
 Facelis retusa (Naturalised)
 Galinsoga parviflora (Naturalised)
 Gamochaeta calviceps (Naturalised)
 Gamochaeta coarctata (Naturalised)
 Gamochaeta purpurea (Naturalised)
 Hypochaeris glabra (Naturalised)
 Hypochaeris radicata (Naturalised)
 Montanoa hibiscifolia (Naturalised)
 Picris burbidgeae (Naturalised)
 Pseudognaphalium luteoalbum Senecio australis Senecio evansianus (Endemic)
 Senecio hooglandia (Endemic)
 Sigesbeckia orientalis (Naturalised)
 Silybum marianum (Naturalised)
 Soliva pterosperma (Naturalised)
 Sonchus oleraceus (Naturalised)
 Tagetes minuta (Naturalised)
 Taraxacum officinale (Naturalised)
 Tragopogon porrifolius (Naturalised)
 Melanthera bifloraBasellaceae
 Anredera cordifolia (Naturalised)

Bignoniaceae
 Tecomaria capensis (Naturalised)

Boraginaceae
 Cynoglossum australe (Naturalised)
 Echium plantagineum (Naturalised)

Brassicaceae
 Brassica juncea (Naturalised)
 Brassica napus (Naturalised)
 Capsella bursa-pastoris (Naturalised)
 Cardamine hirsuta (Naturalised)
 Coronopus didymus (Naturalised)
 Lepidium bonariense (Naturalised)
 Lobularia maritima (Naturalised)
 Matthiola incana (Naturalised)
 Rapistrum rugosum (Naturalised)
 Rorippa nasturtium-aquaticum (Naturalised)
 Sisymbrium officinale (Naturalised)
 Sisymbrium orientale (Naturalised)

Caesalpiniaceae
 Caesalpinia bonduc Caesalpinia decapetala (Naturalised)
 Caesalpinia major (Naturalised)
 Chamaecrista rotundifolia (Naturalised)
 Senna septemtrionalis (Naturalised)

Campanulaceae
 Lobelia anceps Pratia purpurascens (Naturalised)
 Wahlenbergia gracilis Wahlenbergia littoricola subsp. vernicosa
 Wahlenbergia violaceae (Status uncertain, most likely naturalised)

Cannabaceae
 Celtis paniculataCapparaceae
 Capparis nobilis (Endemic)

Caprifoliaceae
 Lonicera japonica (Naturalised)

Caryophyllaceae
 Cerastium fontanum subsp. vulgare (Naturalised)
 Cerastium glomeratum (Naturalised)
 Paronychia brasiliana (Naturalised)
 Petrorhagia velutina (Naturalised)
 Polycarpon tetraphyllum (Naturalised)
 Sagina apetala (Naturalised)
 Silene gallica (Naturalised)
 Stellaria media (Naturalised)

Casuarinaceae
 Casuarina glaucaCelastraceae
 Elaeodendron curtipendulumConvolvulaceae
 Calystegia affinis (Endemic)
 Calystegia soldanella Dichondria micrantha (Naturalised)
 Dichondra repens Ipomoea alba (Naturalised)
 Ipomoea cairica (Naturalised)
 Ipomoea indica (Naturalised)
 Ipomoea pes-caprae subsp. brasiliensis

Corynocarpaceae
 Corynocarpus laevigatus (Naturalised)

Crassulaceae
 Bryophyllum delagoaense (Naturalised)
 Bryophyllum pinnatum (Naturalised)
 Crassula multicava subsp. multicava (Naturalised)

Cucurbitaceae
 Cucumis anguria (Naturalised)
 Diplocyclos palmatus subsp. affinis
 Sicyos australis Zehneria bauerianaEuphorbiaceae
 Acalypha wilkesiana (Naturalised)
 Baloghia inophylla Breynia disticha (Naturalised)
 Euphorbia cyathophora (Naturalised)
 Euphorbia norfolkiana (Endemic)
 Euphorbia obliqua Euphorbia peplus (Naturalised)
 Euphorbia prostrata (Naturalised)
 Excoecaria agallocha Homalanthus populifolius (Naturalised)
 Phyllanthus tenellus (Naturalised)
 Ricinus communis (Naturalised)

Fabaceae
 Canacalia rosea Castanospermum australe (Naturalised)
 Chamaecytisus palmensis (Naturalised)
 Crotalaria agatiflora (Naturalised)
 Desmodium incanum (Naturalised)
 Desmodium tortuosum (Naturalised)
 Dipogon lignosus (Naturalised)
 Erythrina caffra (Naturalised)
 Erythrina speciosa (Naturalised)
 Glycone microphylla (Naturalised)
 Indigofera suffruticosa (Naturalised)
 Lablab purpureus (Naturalised)
 Lotus angustissimus (Naturalised)
 Lupinus cosentinii (Naturalised)
 Medicago lupulina (Naturalised)
 Medicago polymorpha (Naturalised)
 Melilotus indicus (Naturalised)
 Millettia australis Neotonia wightii (Naturalised)
 Pueraria lobata (Naturalised)
 Streblorrhiza speciosa (Endemic)
 Teline monspessulana (Naturalised)
 Trifolium campestre (Naturalised)
 Trifolium dubium (Naturalised)
 Trifolium glomeratum (Naturalised)
 Trifolium suffocatum (Naturalised)
 Vicia hirsuta (Naturalised)
 Vicia sativa subsp. nigra (Naturalised)
 Vicia tetrasperma (Naturalised)
 Vigna marinaFrankeniaceae
 Frankenia pulverulenta (Naturalised)

Fumariaceae
 Fumaria muralis (Naturalised)

Gentianaceae
 Centaurium tenuiflorum (Naturalised)

Geraniaceae
 Erodium moschatum (Naturalised)
 Geranium dissectum (Naturalised)
 Geranium gardneri (Naturalised)
 Pelargonium australe (Naturalised)
 Pelargonium panduriforme (Naturalised)

Lamiaceae
 Lavandula dentata (Naturalised)
 Marrubium vulgare (Naturalised)
 [[Mentha × piperita|Mentha × piperita]] (Naturalised)
 Mentha spicata (Naturalised)
 Salvia coccinea (Naturalised)
 Salvia verbenaca (Naturalised)
 Stachys arvensis (Naturalised)

Lauraceae
 Cinnamomum camphora (Naturalised)
 Cryptocarya triplinervis (Naturalised)
 Persea americana (Naturalised)

Linaceae
 Linum marginale (Naturalised)
 Linum trigynum (Naturalised)

Loranthaceae
 Ileostylus micranthus

Lythraceae
 Lythrum hyssopifolia (Naturalised)

Malvaceae
 Abutilon grandifolium (Naturalised)
 Abutilon julianae (Endemic)
 Hibiscus diversifolius
 Hibiscus insularis (Endemic)
 Hibiscus pedunculatus (Naturalised)
 Hibiscus tiliaceus
 Lagunaria patersonia subsp. patersonia
 Malva parviflora (Naturalised)
 Malvastrum coromandelianum (Naturalised)
 Modiola caroliniana (Naturalised)
 Pavonia hastata (Naturalised)
 Sida carpinifolia (Naturalised)
 Sida rhombifolia (Naturalised)
 Ungeria floribunda (Endemic)

Meliaceae
 Dysoxylum bijugum
 Melia azedarach (Naturalised)

Mimosaceae
 Acacia dealbata (Naturalised)
 Acacia parramattensis (Naturalised)
 Paraserianthes lophantha (Naturalised)

Moraceae
 Ficus carica (Naturalised)
 Streblus pendulinus

Myoporaceae
 Myoporum obscurum (Endemic)

Myrtaceae
 Eucalyptus botryoides (Naturalised)
 Eucalyptus fibrosa (Naturalised)
 Eugenia uniflora (Naturalised)
 Metrosideros excelsa (Naturalised)
 Metrosideros kermadecensis (Naturalised)
 Metrosideros excelsa x kermadecensis  (Hybrid of indigenous and naturalised species)
 Psidium cattleianum var. cattleianum (Naturalised)
 Psidium cattleianum var. littorale (Naturalised)
 Psidium guajava (Naturalised)

Nyctaginaceae
 Mirabilis jalapa (Naturalised)
 Pisonia brunoniana

Ochnaceae
 Ochna serrulata (Naturalised)

Oleaceae
 Jasminum simplicifolium subsp. australiense
 Ligustrum lucidum (Naturalised)
 Ligustrum sinense (Naturalised)
 Olea europaea subsp. cuspidata (Naturalised)

Onagraceae
 Oenothera affinis (Naturalised)
 Oenothera rosea (Naturalised)
 Oenothera stricta (Naturalised)
 Oenothera tetraptera (Naturalised)

Orobanchaceae
 Orobanche minor (Naturalised)

Oxalidaceae
 Oxalis chnoodes (Naturalised)
 Oxalis corniculata (Naturalised)
 Oxalis debilis (Naturalised)
 Oxalis exilis
 Oxalis radicosa (Naturalised)

Papaveraceae
 Argemone subfusiformis (Naturalised)
 Papaver somniferum (Naturalised)

Passifloraceae
 Passiflora aurantia
 Passiflora edulis (Naturalised)

Pennantiaceae
 Pennantia endlicheri (Endemic)

Phytolaccaceae
 Phytolacca octandra (Naturalised)
 Rivina humilis (Naturalised)

Piperaceae
 Macropiper excelsum subsp. psittacorum
 Peperomia tetraphylla
 Peperomia urvilleana

Pittosporaceae
 Pittosporum bracteolatum (Endemic)
 Pittosporum crassifolium (Naturalised)
 Pittosporum undulatum (Naturalised)

Plantaginaceae
 Plantago debilis (Naturalised)
 Plantago lanceolata (Naturalised)
 Plantago major (Naturalised)
 Russelia equisetiformis (Naturalised)

Plumbaginaceae
 Plumbago auriculata (Naturalised)
 Plumbago zeylanica

Polygalaceae
 Polygala myrtifolia (Naturalised)

Polygonaceae
 Fallopia convolvulus (Naturalised)
 Muehlenbeckia australis
 Persicaria decipiens
 Rumex brownii (Naturalised)
 Rumex conglomeratus (Naturalised)

Portulacaceae
 Portulaca oleracea (Naturalised)

Primulaceae
 Anagallis arvensis (Naturalised)
 Rapanea ralstoniae (Endemic)
 Samolus repens var. stricta

Proteaceae
 Grevillea robusta (Naturalised)
 Hakea salicifolia (Naturalised)
 Hakea sericea (Naturalised)
 Macadamia tetraphylla (Naturalised)

Ranunculaceae
 Clematis dubia (Endemic)
 Ranunculus muricatus (Naturalised)
 Ranunculus parviflora (Naturalised)
 Ranunculus repens (Naturalised)
 Ranunculus sessiliflorus (Naturalised)

Rosaceae
 Duchesnea indica (Naturalised)
 Eriobotrya japonica (Naturalised)
 Rhaphiolepis umbellata (Naturalised)
 Rubus fruticosus (Naturalised)

Rubiaceae
 Coffea arabica (Naturalised)
 Coprosma baueri (Endemic)
 Coprosma pilosa (Endemic)
 Pentas lanceolata (Naturalised)
 Sherardia arvensis (Naturalised)

Rutaceae
 Citrus jambhiri (Naturalised)
 Melicope littoralis (Endemic)
 Sarcomelicope simplicifolia subsp. simplicifolia
 Zanthoxylum pinnatum

Santalaceae
 Exocarpus phyllanthoides var. phyllanthoides

Sapindaceae
 Dodonaea viscosa subsp. viscosa

Sapotaceae
 Pouteria costata

Scrophulariaceae
 Calceolaria tripartita (Naturalised)
 Misopates orontium (Naturalised)
 Verbascum thapsus (Naturalised)
 Verbascum virgatum (Naturalised)
 Veronica arvensis (Naturalised)
 Veronica persica (Naturalised)
 Veronica plebeia (Naturalised)

Solanaceae
 Brugmansia suaveolens (Naturalised)
 Datura stramonium (Naturalised)
 Lycium ferocissimum (Naturalised)
 Lycopersicon esculentum (Naturalised)
 Nicandra physalodes (Naturalised)
 Nicotiana tabacum (Naturalised)
 Petunia × hybrida (Naturalised)
 Physalis peruviana (Naturalised)
 Solandra maxima (Naturalised)
 Solanum americanum subsp. nutans
 Solanum aviculare (Extinct)
 Solanum bauerianum (Endemic)
 Solanum linneanum (Naturalised)
 Solanum mauritianum (Naturalised)

Thymelaeaceae
 Wikstroemia australis

Tiliaceae
 Triumfetta rhomboidea

Urticaceae
 Boehmeria australis subsp. australis (Endemic)
 Boehmeria nivea (Naturalised)
 Elatostema montanum (Endemic)
 Parietaria debilis
 Pilea microphylla (Naturalised)
 Urtica urens (Naturalised)

Verbenaceae
 Duranta erecta (Naturalised)
 Lantana camara (Naturalised)
 Verbena bonariensis (Naturalised)
 Verbena litoralis (Naturalised)

Violaceae
 Melicytus latifolius (Endemic)
 Melicytus remiflorus subsp. oblongifolius (Endemic)
 Viola betonicifolia subsp. nova-guineensis
 Viola tricolor (Naturalised)

Viscaceae
 Korthalsella disticha (Endemic)

Monocotyledons
The Monocotyledons (monocots) are represented on Norfolk Island by 16 families, 81 genera, and 110 species. Most of them are naturalised, with naturalised grasses account for 5 families, 47 genera and 67 species. Of the 43 indigenous species, 9 are endemic.

Agavaceae
 Agave americana (Naturalised)
 Cordyline obtecta
 Furcraea foetida (Naturalised)
 Phormium tenax

Alliaceae
 Nothoscordum borbonicum (Naturalised)

Araceae
 Colocasia esculenta (Naturalised)
 Xanthosoma sagittifolium (Naturalised)
 Zantedeschia aethiopica (Naturalised)

Arecaceae
 Howea forsteriana (Naturalised)
 Phoenix canariensis (Naturalised)
 Rhopalostylis baueri

Asphodelaceae
 Aloe maculata (Naturalised)

Cannaceae
 Canna indica (Naturalised)

Colchicaceae
 Gloriosa superba (Naturalised)

Commelinaceae
 Commelina cyanea
 Tradescantia zebrina (Naturalised)

Cyperaceae
 Bolboschoenus fluviatilis
 Carex breviculmis
 Carex inversa
 Carex neesiana (Endemic)
 Cyperus albostriatus (Naturalised)
 Cyperus gracilis (Naturalised)
 Cyperus involucratus (Naturalised)
 Cyperus lucidus
 Cyperus rotundus (Naturalised)
 Eleocharis acuta
 Isolepis inundata
 Isolepis nodosa
 Isolepis cernua var. setiformis (Endemic)
 Kyllinga brevifolia
 Pycreus polystachyos
 Schoenoplectus validus

Hemerocallidaceae
 Dianella intermedia (Endemic)

Iridaceae
 Anomatheca laxa (Naturalised)
 Ferraria crispa (Naturalised)
 Gladiolus × hortulanus (Naturalised)
 Homeria flaccida (Naturalised)
 Sisyrinchium micranthum (Naturalised)
 Tritonia crocata (Naturalised)
 Tritonia lineata (Naturalised)

Juncaceae
 Juncus articulatus (Naturalised)
 Juncus australis (Naturalised)
 Juncus bufonius (Naturalised)
 Juncus continuus
 Juncus pallidus (Naturalised)
 Juncus usitatus (Naturalised)

Liliaceae
 Alstroemeria pulchella (Naturalised)
 Asparagus aethiopicus (Naturalised)
 Asparagus plumosis (Naturalised)
 Crinum asiaticum var. pedunculatum
 Lilium formosanum (Naturalised)

Limnocharitaceae
 Hydrocleys nymphoides

Orchidaceae
 Bulbophyllum argyropus
 Dendrobium brachypus (Endemic)
 Dendrobium macropus subsp. macropus (Endemic)
 Microtis unifolia
 Oberonia titania
 Phreatia limenophylax (Endemic)
 Phreatia paleata
 Taeniophyllum muelleri
 Thelymitra longifolia (Probably indigenous)
 Tropidia viridifusca

Pandanaceae
 Freycinetia baueriana (Endemic)

Poaceae
 Agrostis avenacea
 Aira cupaniana (Naturalised)
 Ammophila arenaria (Naturalised)
 Anthoxanthum odoratum (Naturalised)
 Arundo donax (Naturalised)
 Avena fatua (Naturalised)
 Avena sativa (Naturalised)
 Axonopus fissifolius (Naturalised)
 Bothriochloa macra (Naturalised)
 Briza maxima (Naturalised)
 Briza minor (Naturalised)
 Bromus arenarius (Naturalised)
 Bromus diandrus (Naturalised)
 Bromus hordeaceus (Naturalised)
 Bromus scoparius (Naturalised)
 Bromus willdenowii (Naturalised)
 Catapodium rigidum (Naturalised)
 Cenchrus caliculatus (Possibly extinct)
 Chloris gayana (Naturalised)
 Cortaderia selloana (Naturalised)
 Cymbopogon refractus
 Cynodon dactylon (Naturalised)
 Dactylis glomerata (Naturalised)
 Dichelachne crinita
 Dichelachne micrantha
 Digitaria ciliaris (Naturalised)
 Digitaria setigera
 Echinochloa crusgalli (Naturalised)
 Echinopogon ovatus
 Ehrharta erecta (Naturalised)
 Eleusine indica (Naturalised)
 Elymus multiflorus subsp. kingianus
 Elymus scaber
 Eragrostis brownii (Naturalised)
 Hordeum murinum (Naturalised)
 Lepturus repens  (Possibly indigenous)
 Lolium perenne (Naturalised)
 Lolium rigidum var. rigidum (Naturalised)
 Lolium rigidum var. rottboellioides (Naturalised)
 Melinis minutiflora (Naturalised)
 Microlaena stipoides
 Oplismenus hirtellus subsp. hirtellus
 Oplismenus hirtellus subsp. imbecillus
 Panicum effusum
 Panicum maximum (Naturalised)
 Paspalum dilatatum (Naturalised)
 Paspalum orbiculare
 Paspalum scrobiculatum
 Pennisetum clandestinum (Naturalised)
 Pennisetum purpureum (Naturalised)
 Phalaris minor (Naturalised)
 Poa annua (Naturalised)
 Poa pratensis (Naturalised)
 Rhynchelytrum repens (Naturalised)
 Rostraria cristata (Naturalised)
 Setaria palmifolia (Naturalised)
 Setaria pumila subsp. pallidefusca (Naturalised)
 Setaria verticillata (Naturalised)
 Sorghum arundinaceum (Naturalised)
 Spinifex sericeus (Naturalised)
 Sporobolus africanus (Naturalised)
 Sporobolus virginicus
 Stenotaphrum secundatum (Naturalised)
 Trisetum arduanum (Naturalised)
 Vulpia bromoides (Naturalised)
 Vulpia myuros f. megalura (Naturalised)

Pontederiaceae
 Eichhornia crassipes (Naturalised)

Smilacaceae
 Geitonoplesium cymosum

Typhaceae
 Typha orientalis

Pinophyta
Two species of Pinophyta (conifers) occur on Norfolk Island: the popular endemic Araucaria heterophylla (Norfolk Island Pine), and the naturalised Cupressus lusitanica.

Araucariaceae
 Araucaria heterophylla (Endemic)

Cupressaceae
 Cupressus lusitanica (Naturalised)

Pteridophyta
The Pteridophyta (ferns) are represented on Norfolk Island by 14 families, 24 genera, and 37 species. Seven species are endemic; none are naturalised.

Adiantaceae
 Adiantum diaphanum
 Adiantum pubescens
 Cheilanthes distans
 Cheilanthes sieberi
 Pellaea rotundifolia

Aspleniaceae
 Asplenium australasicum f. australasicum
 Asplenium australasicum f. robinsonii
 Asplenium difforme
 Asplenium dimorphum (Endemic)
 Asplenium polyodon

Athyriaceae
 Diplazium assimile
 Diplazium australe
 Lunathyrium japonicum

Azollaceae
 Azolla pinnata

Blechnaceae
 Blechnum norfolkianum
 Doodia aspera
 Doodia media

Cyatheaceae
 Cyathea australis subsp. norfolkensis (Endemic
 Cyathea brownii (Endemic)

Davalliaceae
 Arthropteris tenella
 Nephrolepis cordifolia
 Nephrolepis flexuosa

Dennstaedtiaceae
 Histiopteris incisa
 Hypolepis dicksonioides
 Hypolepis distans (Naturalised)
 Hypolepis tenuifolia
 Pteridium esculentum

Dryopteridaceae
 Arachnoides aristata
 Lastreopsis calantha (Endemic)

Gleicheniaceae
 Dicranopteris linearis

Hymenophyllaceae
 Cephalomanes bauerianum (Endemic)
 Credidomanes endlicherianum
 Credidomanes saxifragioides

Marattiaceae
 Marattis salicina

Nephrolepidaceae
Nephrolepis cordifolia (Naturalised)

Polypodiaceae
 Phymatosorus pustulatus subsp. pustulatus
 Platycerium bifurcatum(Naturalised)
 Pyrrosia confluens

Pteridaceae
 Pteris kingiana (Endemic)
 Pteris tremula
 Pteris zahlbruckneriana (Endemic)
 Pteris vittata (Naturalised)

Salviniaceae
 Salvinia molesta (Naturalised)

Thelypteridaceae
 Christella dentata
 Christella parasitica
 Macrothelypteris torresiana

Vittariaceae
 Vittaria elongata

Lycopodiophyta
Norfolk Island has two species of Lycopodiophyta, the indigenous club moss Lycopodiella cernua and the naturalised spikemoss Selaginella kraussiana.

Lycopodiaceae
 Lycopodiella cernua

Selaginellaceae
 Selaginella kraussiana (Naturalised)

Psilotophyta
Norfolk Island has two species of Psilotophyta.

Psilotaceae
 Psilotum nudum
 Tmesipteris norfolkensis (Endemic)

Ophioglossophyta
Norfolk Island has one species of Ophioglossophyta.

Ophioglossaceae
 Ophioglossum petiolatum

Notes

References
 
 

 
Norfolk Island, Flora of